Government in South Australia is delivered by a number of agencies, grouped under areas of portfolio responsibility. Each portfolio is led by a government minister who is a member of the Parliament of South Australia, appointed by the Governor as the representative of the Crown.

The agencies are principally grouped around departments, each led by a secretary, director-general or similarly title executive officer and comprising a number of portfolios covering specific policy areas across the department and allocated statutory authorities, trading enterprises, boards, councils and other public bodies.

Agencies have varying levels of operational autonomy, and deliver one or more of frontline public services, administrative functions and law enforcement. Some are structured as for-profit corporations. Where there are multiple portfolios within a department, directors-general may be accountable to a number of ministers.

All agencies are identifiable by their corporate logo, which features in agency advertising, publications and correspondence, pictured right.

A list of articles on South Australian government agencies sorted alphabetically is available at Government agencies of South Australia. The South Australian government maintains a list of agencies and their contact details  at its website.

Attorney-General's Department

The South Australian Attorney-General's Department (AGD) brings together a diverse group of functions across justice, rights protection and public safety on behalf of the community. Agencies include:

Office of the Chief Executive
Finance, People and Performance
Fines Enforcement and Recovery Unit
Legal, Legislative and Rights Protection Services (LLRPS) Division
Legal Services
The Crown Solicitor's Office
The Solicitor-General
The Office of the Director of Public Prosecutions
The Office of the Parliamentary Counsel
Legislative Services
Library
Rights Protection and Social Justice
The Office of the Public Advocate
The Office of the Commissioner for Equal Opportunity
The Office of the Commissioner for Victims’ Rights
The Office of the Public Trustee
The Office of the Ombudsman 
The Office of the Police Ombudsman (OPO)
South Australian Civil and Administrative Tribunal (SACAT)
South Australian Employment Tribunal (SAET)
The Industrial Relations Court and Commission
The South Australian Health Practitioners Tribunal
Forensic Science SA (FSSA)
Projects and Technology
 Office of Crime Statistics and Research (OCSAR)
Safework SA
Consumer and Business Services
State Records of South Australia

Auditor-General's Department
The Auditor-General's Department provides the Parliament and public sector entities with independent professional opinions on matters related to financial management, compliance with legislative requirements.

Department for Human Services
The Department for Human Services (DHS) (previously the Department for Communities and Social Inclusion (DCSI)) brings together a range of services, funding and policy responsibilities which together support safety, equality, opportunity and justice across South Australia. The Department includes:

 Community and Organisational Support
 Disability SA
 Disability Services
 Domiciliary Care
 Financial and Business Services
 Housing SA
 HomeStart Finance
 Interpreting and Translating Centre
 Multicultural SA
 NDIS and Service Reform
 Northern Connections
 Office for Problem Gambling
 Office for Volunteers
 Office for Women
 Office for Youth
 Policy and Community Development
 Procurement and Grants
 Screening Unit
 Southern Connections
 State Recovery
 Youth Justice

Department for Correctional Services
Department for Correctional Services

South Australian Country Fire Service
South Australian Country Fire Service

Courts Administration Authority
Courts Administration Authority

Defence SA
Defence SA

Electoral Commission of South Australia
Electoral Commission of South Australia

Department for Education

The Department for Education delivers and coordinates children's services and schooling.

Department of Environment and Water

Department for Health and Wellbeing (SA Health)
SA Health is responsible for protecting and improving public health by providing leadership in health reform, policy development and planning:

Local Health Networks (LHNs):
Central Adelaide LHN
Royal Adelaide Hospital
Queen Elizabeth Hospital
Hampstead Rehabilitation Hospital
Woodville GP Plus Health Centre
Southern Adelaide LHN
Noarlunga Hospital
Flinders Medical Centre
Repatriation General Hospital
Aldinga, Noarlunga, Morphett Vale and Marion GP Plus Health Care Centres
Northern Adelaide LHN
Modbury Hospital
Lyell McEwin Hospital
Modbury and Elizabeth GP Plus Health Care Centres
Country Health SA LHN
country hospitals
Ceduna and Port Pirie GP Plus Health Care Centres
Patient Assistance Transport Schemen (PATS)
Women's and Children's LHN
Women's and Children's Hospital
 SA Ambulance Service

The following agencies report to a designated LHN:
SA Dental Service
Breastscreen SA
Donate Life
Prison Health
SA Pathology
SA Medical Imaging
SA Pharmacy
Biomedical Engineering
Sterilisation

Department for Health and Ageing divisions:
Office for the Ageing
Adelaide Aged Care Assessment Team
Seniors Card
retirement villages
Public Health and Clinical Systems
public health
communicable disease control
emergency management
health promotion
Health Reform
delivery of the New Royal Adelaide Hospital and Glenside Campus redevelopment
South Australian Health and Medical Research Institute
alignment with national reform agenda
E-Health Systems
EPAS (Electronic Patient Enterprise System)
information strategy
ICT
Health System Development
Aboriginal health
media and communications, intergovernment relations
service development
Mental Health and Substance Abuse
mental health operations
Drug and Alcohol Services SA (DASSA)
SA Health Workforce
human resources and workforce health
organisational development and learning
Health System Performance
assets, finance, revenue, procurement
records management

Legal Services Commission
The Legal Services Commission is a statutory authority, independent of government, "funded by both the South Australian and the Commonwealth Governments to provide legal assistance to South Australians".

South Australian Metropolitan Fire Service
South Australian Metropolitan Fire Service

Department of Infrastructure and Transport

The Department of Infrastructure and Transport (renamed from Department of Planning, Transport and Infrastructure in August 2020) has responsibilities in relation to guiding and administering the South Australian planning and development assessment system, and for transport system and services. The department also works regularly with police in regards to motor vehicle registration, enforcement of speed limits and other road matters.

Department of the Premier and Cabinet

The Department of the Premier and Cabinet (DPC) provides central agency leadership on matters that affect South Australia's prosperity. It provides economic and policy advice to support the government's strategic priorities, the state's international relationships and the management of ICT Strategy, innovation and investment. DPC publishes and advances South Australia's Strategic Plan and has expressed commitments to community engagement, excellence in service delivery and good business practice.

Its responsibilities include, among others:

Aboriginal affairs and Reconciliation
Arts and culture
Art and heritage conservation
Community engagement
ICT, digital and cyber security
Development of Lot Fourteen
Multicultural affairs
Emergency management

Primary Industries and Regions SA (PIRSA)

Primary Industries and Regions SA (PIRSA), formerly the Department of Primary Industries and Regions South Australia, is an agency focussed on driving economic growth in the state. Its aim is to "grow primary industries and drive regional development". Its key areas of work include primary sector industries (in SA, mainly agriculture, viticulture and farming of livestock), marine aquaculture, and Biosecurity.

The South Australian Research and Development Institute (SARDI) is the state government's principal research institute, and forms part of PIRSA.

Department of Treasury and Finance
Department of Treasury and Finance, in the portfolio of the Treasurer of South Australia, provides economic, policy and financial advice to the Government, manages the whole of Government financial management processes, including preparation of the state budget, and provides finance-related services across Government.

, the Urban Renewal Authority, trading as Renewal SA, is within the Treasurer's portfolio.

Department of Trade and Investment
The Department for Trade and Investment (DTI) exists in order to foster economic growth in the state, by attracting new foreign investment as well as increasing exports in appropriate sectors. It uses the branding "South Australia" and "I choose SA" to promote investment.

The Planning and Land Use Services Division lies within this department, and the Office for Design and Architecture SA (ODASA) within that. The ODASA team is led by the South Australian Government Architect and has expertise in architecture, heritage, landscape architecture, urban design and urban planning. The Government Architect role in South Australia:
 oversees the state’s Design Review program
 provides independent design advice on large-scale development proposals
 supports current planning reforms and the State Planning Commission
 provides independent design advice to Cabinet
 supports infrastructure, planning delivery across government
 supports government procurement

SAFECOM
The South Australian Fire and Emergency Services Commission (SAFECOM) oversees volunteers and employees within the fire and emergency services sector.

SAFECOM works with are:
 the South Australian Country Fire Service (CFS)
 the South Australian Metropolitan Fire Service (MFS) 
 the South Australian State Emergency Service (SES)

SAFECOM submits an annual report to the Minister for Emergency Services each year.

South Australia Police
South Australia Police

Department for Innovation and Skills

Aboriginal Affairs & Reconciliation
Aboriginal Lands Trust
 Arts SA
 Carrick Hill Trust
 Art Gallery of South Australia
 South Australian Museum
 State Library of South Australia
History Trust of South Australia
South Australian Country Arts Trust
 State Opera of South Australia
Adelaide Festival Corporation
 Adelaide Festival Centre Trust
 South Australian Film Corporation
 State Theatre Company of South Australia
 Skills and Employment
 Strategy and Business Services
 Industry and Innovation
 International Engagement, Trade, Immigration and Higher Education
 Mineral Resources
 Energy Resources
Energy Markets and Programs
Resources Infrastructure & Investment Task Force
Training and Skills Commission
Office of the Training Advocate 
Health Industries SA
Office for the Commissioner for Aboriginal Engagement
BioSA Advisory Board
Office of the Industry Advocate
Office of the Small Business Commissioner
Education Adelaide
Investment Attraction South Australia 
Office of the Economic Development Board
Australian Cyber Collaboration Centre, opened July 2020

State Emergency Service
State Emergency Service

Unclassified
Capital City Committee Directorate
Adelaide Cemeteries Authority
 Adelaide Film Festival
Local Government Grants Commission
Outback Communities Authority
Office for Recreation, Sport  and Racing 
South Australian Sports Institute

See also

 Government of South Australia

References

 *
Lists of government agencies in Australia
Government agencies